Andrei Vladimirovich Skoch (born 30 January 1966) is a Russian billionaire businessman, part owner of the steelmaker . According to the U.S. Forbes Magazine, Skoch is among the richest Russians and was listed in The World's Billionaires in 2012. Skoch is a member of the State Duma of the Russian Federation since 1999.

Early life
He was born on January 30, 1966, in the village of Nikolskoye, Moscow region. He served in the Soviet Army in 1984.

He was educated at the Institute of Physical Culture and wrote his dissertation there. In 1998, he graduated from the Moscow State University for Humanities named after M. A. Sholokhov (former Moscow State Open Pedagogical University (MSOPU)), Faculty of Psychology.

Career
In the late 1980s, he went into business and opened a bakery with Lev Kvetnoi. After that, he sold computer components and owned fuel distribution companies. He held the post of Deputy General Director at “Kuznetsov and Partners LLC”.

In 1995, he joined the capital and became Deputy General Director of the investment company “Interfin”.

He worked for MontazhSpetsBank before joining fellow billionaire Alisher Usmanov in the metals business.

Skoch met Usmanov in 1995, while he was working as an oil trader for the bank. Together with Lev Kvetnoi, and Skoch, Usmanov's first purchases were the Lebedinsky Mining and a steel production plant in Belgorod.

In 1999, Skoch became Deputy General at JSC Lebedinsky GOK.

Usmanov formed the Metalloinvest conglomerate in 2006 after the acquisition of Mikhailovsky GOK. The merge included Lebedinsky Mining, and Skoch continues to be a partner in the company. Skoch owns 30% of Metalloinvest, though the shares are reportedly held in his father Vladimir's name.

In 2016, a list of members of parliament whose names appeared in the Panama Papers was published. Among them was also Skoch.

In April 2018, the United States imposed sanctions on him and 23 other Russian nationals.

Political career 
In 1999, Skoch became deputy of the State Duma of the third convocation from the Belgorod region. In 2000, he took the post of the Chairman of the Expert Council on Metallurgy and the Mining Industry. In the same year, he defended his thesis entitled “Charity in Russia as a means of social protection of childhood”.

In December 2003, he was elected a deputy of the State Duma of the IV convocation. In December 2007, he became a deputy of the State Duma of the V convocation in the list of candidates of United Russia. Since  2012, he has been a member of the inter-factional deputy group for the protection of Christian values.

In December 2011, he was elected a deputy of the State Duma of the VI convocation. In September 2016, became a deputy of the State Duma of the VII convocation.

From 1999 to 2019, during the term of office of the deputy of the State Duma of the III, IV, V, VI and VII convocations, he co-authored 163 legislative initiatives and amendments to draft federal laws.

Charity
Since 2005, Skoch regularly organizes a charitable International youth seminar «New Generation». As of 2022, the seminar was held 33 times.

He is a creator of the humanitarian Pokolenie ("Generation") Foundation. It supports cultural workers and scientists, families with three or more children, veterans of World War II, senior citizens and many others. The foundation also finances the construction of medical facilities in Belgorod Oblast and provides financial support for the reconstruction and restoration of military cemeteries.

In 2007, Skoch provided veterans of the Great Patriotic War from Belgorod region with personal VAZ-2105 (3000 vehicles for 260 million rubles).

In 2012, medical institutions of the Belgorod Region received 51 new ambulances from the Pokolenie ("Generation") Foundation. In the same year, the Foundation carried out the reconstruction of the cemetery of the Soviet Army servicemen in Szekesfehervar and the Soviet section of the Kerepesi Cemetery in Budapest (Hungary). During the reconstruction, more than a thousand soldiers of the 2nd and 3rd Ukrainian fronts were identified. A memorial was erected at the cemetery in Szekesfehervar.

In 2013, the Foundation presented VAZ-2104 to 180 large families from the Belgorod Region.

He has reportedly donated over $117 million, a portion of which was earmarked for the restoration of war monuments in Russia. Through the Pokolenie Foundation, Skoch is the sponsor of the Debut Prize, a literary award for Russian writers under the age of 25.

Controversies and sanctions 
According to the U.S. Treasury Department, because Skoch has, alongside his role as deputy of Duma, long maintained ties to organized crime and for a time was alleged to have headed a criminal group himself, he was added to the sanctions list by the U.S. in the wake of sanctions against Russia along with other Russian oligarchs - all of whom are close to the Kremlin and therefore must share the consequences of their government's political actions. 

In relation to the 2022 Russian invasion of Ukraine, on 23 February 2022, Skoch was added to the EU sanctions list, citing the following reason:

On 15 March 2022 Skoch was also added to the UK asset freeze and travel ban sanctions list "in respect of actions undermining or threatening the territorial integrity, sovereignty and independence of Ukraine".

Personal life
Skoch is the father of ten children, four of whom are quadruplets born in 1994. He also has a daughter named Varvara. As of February 2022, he has a grandchild.

After being elected a deputy of the State Duma, Andrei Skoch transferred his share in “Interfin” to his father, Vladimir Nikitovich Skoch. According to Forbes, in addition to 30% in USM, Vladimir Skoch also owns a share in Vnukovo Airport.

Wealth 
According to Bloomberg, Skoch has a net worth of $6.3 billion, as of February 2021. According to the Forbes World's Billionaires List 2021, he ranked 288th on the list of the world's richest people, with an family estimated wealth of $8.6 billion.

He also owns the £100 million yacht Madame Gu. He hired the British PR firm to go after the website that reported on his ownership of the yacht. He has reportedly donated over $117 million, a portion of which was earmarked for the restoration of war monuments in Russia.

Honours 
 Medal of the Order “For Merit to the Fatherland”, Сlass 2 (November 14, 1998) - for services in the field of social rehabilitation of disabled people, protection of their rights and interests.
 Medal of the Order "For Services to the Fatherland " of the first degree (February 13, 2003) - for the achieved labor successes and many years of conscientious work.
 Order of Honor (December 13, 2010) - for a great contribution to perpetuating the memory of Russian and Soviet soldiers who died on the territory of the People's Republic of China, and active charitable work.
 Order of Honor (South Ossetia, May 29, 2011) - for a great contribution to the development and strengthening of friendship and cooperation between peoples, active charitable activities and support provided to the people of the Republic of South Ossetia in the construction of socially significant facilities.
 Order of St. Alexander Nevsky (2016) - for the restoration of monuments and memorials to Russian and Soviet soldiers in the Belgorod Region, China and Hungary.

References 

1966 births
Living people
Businesspeople from Moscow
Russian billionaires
United Russia politicians
21st-century Russian politicians
Russian individuals subject to the U.S. Department of the Treasury sanctions
Russian individuals subject to European Union sanctions
Third convocation members of the State Duma (Russian Federation)
Fourth convocation members of the State Duma (Russian Federation)
Fifth convocation members of the State Duma (Russian Federation)
Sixth convocation members of the State Duma (Russian Federation)
Seventh convocation members of the State Duma (Russian Federation)
Eighth convocation members of the State Duma (Russian Federation)
Russian oligarchs
Politicians from Moscow